Pasar Kliwon is a district (kecamatan) located in the southeastern city of Surakarta, Indonesia where Kraton Surakarta is located.  It is also the concentrated clearly defined-living area of Arab Indonesians, where many of the occupants make living from textile business. Pasar Klewer (Klewer Market), the biggest batik market in Indonesia, is located within the district. Kauman, known as Batik Tourism Village, is also located in this district, which is next to Pasar Klewer.

The following is the list of villages in Pasar Kliwon:
 Kampung Baru (postal code: 57111)
 Kauman (postal code: 57112)
 Kedong Lumbu (postal code: 57113)
 Baluwarti (postal code: 57114)
 Gajahan (postal code: 57115)
 Joyosuran (postal code: 57116)
 Semanggi (postal code: 57117)
 Pasar Kliwon (postal code: 57118)
 Sangkrah (postal code: 57119)

References

External links
 Elevation of Pasar Kliwon
 Pasar Kliwon
 Daftar kecamatan dan kelurahan di Kota Surakarta

Surakarta
Districts of Central Java
Solo River